The list of Florida hurricanes prior to 1900 extends back to 1523 and encompasses 159 North Atlantic hurricanes known to have affected Florida. Since the start of the Atlantic hurricane database in 1851, there were only eight years in which no tropical cyclone affected the state. Collectively, tropical cyclones in Florida resulted in at least 6,504 fatalities and monetary damage of over $90 million (2008 USD). At least 109 boats or ships were either driven ashore, wrecked, or damaged due to the storms.

Information is sparse for earlier years due to limitations in tropical cyclone observation, though as coastlines became more populated, more data became available. The National Hurricane Center recognizes the uncertainty in both the death tolls and the dates of the events.

Pre-1700
1523 – Two ships and their crews are lost during a hurricane on the west Florida coast.
1553 – A hurricane affects the state, killing fewer than 700 people.
Around 1553 – A hurricane hits western Florida, resulting in about 700 casualties. Some modern researchers estimate this is the same storm as the previous event, as some early storms affecting more than one locale may have multiple listings if the storm track is unknown.
1559 – A hurricane off northwestern Florida sinks six Spanish ships.
August 20, 1559 – Around 500 people are killed by a hurricane offshore at western Florida.
September 19, 1559 – A hurricane off the coast of Florida sinks several ships and kills many sailors. Pensacola history notes this hurricane sinking 5 ships, with a Spanish galleon, grounding a caravel, and killing nearly 500 of 1,500 colonists and crewmen at Punta de Santa Maria across from Santa Rosa Island.
1563 – Cape Canaveral experiences the effects of a hurricane, with 284 fatalities reported.
September 22, 1565 – An offshore hurricane washes several French ships ashore between Matanzas Inlet and Cape Canaveral, leaving 71 missing. The hurricane led to the loss of Fort Caroline and ultimately the French influence in Florida.
September 13, 1566 – Rough seas and strong winds are experienced in the northeastern portion of the state by an offshore hurricane. It executes a loop and affects the area three days later.
September 26, 1566 – An offshore hurricane washes a ship ashore near Cape Canaveral.
1571 – Two ships are lost on the Florida coastline during a hurricane, with few survivors.
Fall 1571 – A hurricane makes landfall near Saint Augustine, causing great damage to the city from strong winds and a powerful storm surge.
1589 – One ship is wrecked during a hurricane along the eastern coast of the state.
1591 – 29 ships are lost along the coastal region of Florida during several tropical cyclones.
September 22, 1599 – A hurricane makes landfall a short distance south of Saint Augustine, destroying several houses and flooding the entire town.
September 5, 1622 – 1,090 people are killed during a hurricane in the Straits of Florida.
August 1638 – A hurricane strikes the northeastern portion of the state, though its effects, if any, are unknown.
September 27, 1641 – After passing over the Florida Straits, a hurricane wrecks five ships. The storm produces tropical storm force winds and rough seas along the northeastern portion of the state.
August 19, 1674 – A hurricane known as the Great Storm of 1674 hits near Saint Augustine, and severely damages the town and its fort from rough seas.
1683 – 496 people die from a hurricane that affects east-central Florida, though modern researchers question whether it was a hurricane or not.
October 4, 1695 – A large ship is wrecked in the Florida Keys due to a passing hurricane.

1700s
September 30, 1707 – A hurricane makes landfall near or to the south of Saint Augustine. Most of the houses in the town are destroyed due to the winds and storm surge. The storm drops rainfall there for at least 24 hours.
Late June 1714 – Several ships are wrecked due to a hurricane in the Florida Keys.
1715 – A hurricane sank 11 Spanish ships along a path from Ft. Pierce and south of Cape Canaveral carrying Gold and Silver; today this is known as the Treasure Coast.
July 15, 1733 – A hurricane passes through The Bahamas and southern Florida, killing a total of 56 people.
1741 – A storm hits northwest Florida at Santa Rosa Island.
1752 – A large storm hits northwest Florida at Santa Rosa Island, at Presidio Isla de Santa Rosa, destroying all but 2 buildings.
October 22, 1752 – Multiple vessels are lost during a hurricane off the state.
August 24, 1753 – A tropical storm passing through the northeastern portion of the state drops heavy precipitation.
1758 – A hurricane which strikes St. Marks results in 40 fatalities.
October 23, 1766 – A ship capsizes due to a hurricane off northwestern Florida.
September 25, 1769 – Northeastern Florida experiences strong winds from a hurricane, though it is unknown if it makes landfall or not.
October 29, 1769 – A strong hurricane hits Miami, blowing down several trees and grounding a ship.
June 1777 – A ship is lost off Florida, with the entire crew missing and believed killed.
October 14, 1780 – A storm, possibly related to the Great Hurricane of 1780, impacts the northeastern portion of the state with moderate winds and severe beach erosion.
1781 – About 2,000 people are killed due to a hurricane off the coast of the state.
Early October 1794 – A hurricane estimated to have moved inland from the southwestern portion of the state resulted in moderate beach erosion near Jacksonville.
October 17, 1797 – An offshore hurricane capsizes a few ships off the eastern coast of Florida.

1800–1849
September 7, 1804 – An offshore hurricane sinks eight ships in the harbor of Saint Augustine and destroys the Quasada Battery at the mouth of the St. Johns River from its storm surge.
September 15, 1806 – Saint Augustine receives a landfall from a severe hurricane that destroys several houses, uproots many trees, washes several vessels ashore, and destroys the city pier.
October 4, 1811 – A hurricane of moderate intensity strikes near Saint Augustine, with many houses in the city damaged or destroyed. Shipwrecks were reported throughout the eastern Florida coastline. Several destroyed homes are not rebuilt for 11 years.
October 1, 1812 – A hurricane remains stationary offshore of northeastern Florida, producing severe conditions along portions of the St. Johns River.
September 16, 1813 – The eye of a major hurricane passes over the border between Florida and Georgia.
August 7, 1817 – A tropical storm hits near Apalachicola Bay, though its effects are unknown.
September 1819 – Heavy rainfall is caused by a tropical storm making landfall between New Orleans and Apalachicola.
September 15, 1821 – A hurricane estimated to have made landfall near the border of Alabama and Mississippi produces high tides along the Florida Panhandle, sinking six ships in Pensacola and causing minor damage to homes.
July 8, 1822 – A ship is breached along the extreme western Florida Panhandle as a result of a tropical storm striking Mississippi.
September 14, 1824 – A storm which moves inland near Darien, Georgia brings hurricane force conditions to northeastern Florida.
June 2, 1825 – An early season storm produces gusty and rainy conditions in northeastern Florida after hitting between Cedar Key and Apalachicola.
October 2, 1825 – Saint Augustine is struck by a minimal hurricane. The hurricane produces a 4-foot storm surge, causing some damage to houses, while moderate winds wash four ships aground and damage orange crops.
August 15, 1830 – A hurricane which ultimately moves inland on South Carolina parallels the eastern coast of the state, bringing strong winds and rain to coastal areas.
August 22, 1830 – Just days after the previous storm, another hurricane impacts and parallels the eastern coastline.
June 10, 1831 – A tropical storm which struck the Florida Panhandle brings strong winds to Saint Augustine.
August 15, 1835 – Key West and the Dry Tortugas report gusty winds from a hurricane passing through central Cuba.
September 14, 1835 – A major hurricane strikes southeastern Florida, moves across the state, and recurves in the Gulf of Mexico before hitting near Tampa Bay. In the southeastern portion of the state, the hurricane severely floods several islands, while damage in and around Tampa totals $200,000 (1835 USD, $4.1 million 2008 USD). After moving northeastward through the state, the hurricane destroys the lighthouse at the Ponce de León Inlet.
August 1, 1837 – East-central Florida is struck by a minimal hurricane which produces heavy rainfall and strong winds for northeastern Florida.
August 7, 1837 – A storm estimated to have struck Mississippi destroys several warehouses in Saint Marks from its 6-foot (1.8 m) storm surge.
August 7, 1837 – Simultaneously existing with the previous storm, a hurricane moves ashore near Fernandina Beach, destroying at least nineteen buildings from moderate winds and higher than usual tides.
August 16, 1837 – A storm known as the Calypso Hurricane parallels the eastern coastline offshore and produces tropical storm force winds in the northeastern portion of the state.
Mid-August 1837 – A hurricane makes landfall south of Saint Augustine and after moving northwestward through the state it passes through Tallahassee.
August 30, 1837 – A small storm estimated to have been a major hurricane strikes the northwestern Florida coastline. Considered by some to be the most severe gale in the area, the hurricane produces tides estimated at 15 feet (4.6 m) above normal. Flooding from the storm damages or destroys multiple buildings, causing eight deaths and $230,000 in damage (1837 USD, $4.4 million 2008 USD).
September 13, 1837 – Saint Augustine reports moderate northeasterly winds from a nearby hurricane, though other details are unknown.
September 24, 1837 – A tropical storm believed to have struck the east-central coastline produces moderate winds in northeastern Florida.
October 7, 1837 – The Racer's Storm moves inland to the west of the state, causing moderate damage along the Florida Panhandle.
September 7, 1838 – A hurricane strikes near Key Biscayne, killing 38 people.
September 14, 1841 – The town of St. Joseph is destroyed by a hurricane hitting the Florida Panhandle.
October 18, 1841 – A northeastward moving hurricane passes south of the Florida Keys and wash many ships aground.
August 2, 1842 – A weak tropical storm produces heavy rainfall in northeastern Florida.
September 4, 1842 – Moderate damage is caused by a hurricane passing Key West.
September 22, 1842 – A tropical storm makes landfall near Pensacola.
October 4, 1842 – A 955 mbar major hurricane which makes landfall on northwestern Florida produces a 20-foot (6 m) storm surge at Cedar Key. Strong winds result in severe damage in Tallahassee, where damage amounts to $500,000 (1842 USD, $11.1 million 2008 USD). Saint Augustine reports strong winds and heavy rainfall.
October 26, 1842 – An offshore storm produces tropical storm force winds and high tides.
September 13, 1843 – Port Leon is struck by a strong hurricane and is nearly destroyed by its 10-foot (3 m) storm surge. Residents in the city moved four miles northward in response to the hurricane and formed the city of Newport. The hurricane kills 14 in the Florida Panhandle, of which only one occurred in Port Leon.
September 7, 1844 – A small, intense hurricane hits near Daytona Beach, and is considered by one modern historian to be the most severe storm to affect northeastern Florida in the 19th century. After crossing the state, the eye passed over Apalachicola where its strong winds destroyed the roofs of several buildings.
October 4, 1844 – A large hurricane passes through the Florida Straits and produces high tides and strong winds along the eastern coastline.
October 11, 1846 – The Great Havana Hurricane of 1846 passes near Key West with an estimated pressure of 902 mbar (hPa) and winds of possibly Category 5 status, damaging or destroying all but 6 of the houses in the city. 50 are killed, and damage amounts to $200,000 (1846 USD, $4.8 million 2008 USD). It is estimated it struck mainland Florida near Cedar Key, producing severe flooding and strong winds.
September 25, 1848 – The Great Gale of 1848 strikes near Tampa as a major hurricane with an estimated pressure of 948 mbar. Considered one of the most significant hurricanes in the Tampa area, the 15 foot (4.6 m) storm surge from the hurricane destroyed much of Tampa and nearby Fort Brooke.
October 11, 1848 – A major hurricane hits northwestern Florida, causing additional damage to the severe hurricane a few weeks before.

1850–1859
August 23, 1850 – A large hurricane strikes near Apalachicola, with its powerful storm surge destroying many ships and flooding coastal roads.
August 24, 1851 – Apalachicola is hit by a major hurricane, causing severe damage in the St. Marks area from its 12-foot (3.7 m) storm tide.
August 22, 1852 – The first hurricane of the season produces hurricane-force winds in the Florida Keys. It later makes landfall near the Mississippi/Alabama border, producing strong winds and a pressure of 980 mbar in Pensacola.
September 12, 1852 – The third hurricane of the season strikes near Tampa, producing strong winds and high seas in coastal areas. Rainfall from the storm totals 0.55 inches (14 mm) at Fort Meade.
October 9, 1852 – St. Marks is hit by a moderate hurricane which results in downed trees and damage to multiple small structures.
October 20, 1853 – A storm paralleling the northeastern Florida coastline produces hurricane-force winds and coastal flooding.
September 8, 1854 – The third hurricane of the season parallels the northeastern Florida coastline as a major hurricane before striking eastern Georgia. Though it is very severe offshore, impact is minor in Florida.
August 31, 1856 – A Category 2 hurricane hits near Panama City, producing a pressure of 968 mbar and a storm tide of 6 feet (1.8 m) at Apalachicola.
September 15, 1858 – The third tropical storm of the season hits near Tampa Bay and causes little effects as it crosses the state.
September 16, 1859 – A hurricane hits southern Alabama and produces hurricane force conditions in western Florida. The storm produces heavy rainfall including a total of 3.3 inches (84 mm) in Barrancas Barracks, and destroys several buildings near the coast at Pensacola. One ship is washed aground.
October 17, 1859 – A tropical storm hits near Fort Lauderdale, though effects, if any, are unknown.

1860–1869
August 16, 1861 – The second hurricane of the season passes a short distance to the west of the Florida Keys, producing  winds at Fort Jefferson. The storm is believed to have later turned to the northeast, cross over the state, and wash a Confederate ship ashore at Saint Augustine.
November 1, 1861 – A tropical storm hits near Chokoloskee on the southwest coastline, crosses the state, and exits into the Atlantic Ocean near Cape Canaveral. Impact, if any, is unknown.
May 28, 1863 – Strong hurricane "Amanda" struck northwest Florida on May 28; the earliest landfall during a year known in the US.
September 17, 1863 – An offshore tropical storm causes disruption in shipping in the coastal waters off eastern Florida.
October 23, 1865 – The final hurricane of the season passes through the western Florida Keys and hits near Cape Sable, producing heavy rainfall of 4.1 inches (104 mm) in Key West and strong winds throughout the state.
October 6, 1867 – A hurricane hits near the mouth of the Steinhatchee River, though effects, if any, are unknown.
October 4, 1868 – Apalachicola is struck by a tropical storm. There were no reports of damage.

1870–1879
October 9, 1870 – A Category 2 hurricane moves northeastward through the Florida Straits, producing hurricane-force winds across the southern portion of the state. Impact is unknown in the state.
October 20, 1870 – The eye of a moderate hurricane passes over the Dry Tortugas, producing heavy rainfall and widespread debris. It later strikes Chokoloskee, crosses the state, and tracks out to sea. Numerous fatalities were reported in the state.
August 17, 1871 – A major hurricane makes landfall near Palm Beach with a pressure of 952 mbar. The hurricane causes several shipwrecks on the Atlantic coastline, while in Jacksonville moderate winds destroy the roofs of several weak buildings.
August 25, 1871 – The fourth tropical storm and second hurricane of the season hits near Palm Beach, causing at least one shipwreck along the coastline.
September 6, 1871 – A minor hurricane hits near the mouth of the Steinhatchee River and produces heavy rainfall across the state.
October 5, 1871 – Saint Marks is struck by a tropical storm, though its effects, if any, are unknown.
October 23, 1872 – A tropical storm hits near Tampa and produces 5.94 inches (151 mm) of rainfall in Jacksonville.
September 19, 1873 – A hurricane hits near Saint Marks and causes heavy damage in Tallahassee.
September 23, 1873 – Tampa is struck by a tropical storm. Its impact is unknown.
October 7, 1873 – A major hurricane makes landfall near Fort Myers and causes heavy damage in Punta Rassa from its 14-foot (4.3 m) storm tide.
September 28, 1874 – The sixth storm and third hurricane of the season hits near Yankeetown and, after briefly being downgraded to a tropical storm, exits later that day near the Florida-Georgia state line. Impact is unknown.
September 14, 1875 – Key West reports  winds in association with a hurricane that passes to the southwest of the state.
September 27, 1875 – A tropical storm hits near Panama City before quickly dissipating. Its effects are unknown.
September 16, 1876 – Jacksonville experiences  from a tropical storm paralleling the east coast of Florida.
October 20, 1876 – A moderate hurricane passes near Key West and later strikes near Cape Sable, though its impact, if any, is unknown.
September 19, 1877 – After hitting southern Louisiana, a hurricane makes landfall near Panama City, though its effects, if any, are unknown.
October 3, 1877 – The third hurricane of the season strikes near Apalachicola as a major hurricane, producing a storm tide of 12 feet (3.7 m) and a pressure of 988 mbar at Saint Marks. Damage, if any, is unknown.
October 26, 1877 – A tropical storm hits near Cedar Key, causing no known damage.
July 2, 1878 – The first storm of the season moves onshore just south of Fort Myers, though its effects are unknown.
September 8, 1878 – A tropical storm hits near Key Largo, moves northwestward, and strengthens in the Gulf of Mexico before looping to the northeast and striking near Yankeetown as a Category 2 hurricane. There, high tides result in flooding near waterways. At least one death was reported in the state.
October 10, 1878 – Heavy amounts of precipitation is caused by a tropical storm making landfall near Apalachacola.
October 21, 1878 – A hurricane paralleling the east coast of Florida produces winds in excess of  along the coastline and rainfall peaking at 4.8 inches (122 mm) at Key West. Over a dozen ships are driven aground.
October 16, 1879 – Pensacola is struck by a weak tropical storm which produces light winds and moderate rainfall peaking at 2.36 inches (60 mm) in Saint Marks.
October 27, 1879 – A tropical storm hits near Cedar Key, producing gusty winds in Jacksonville but causing no known damage.

1880–1889
August 29, 1880 –68 people die from a shipwreck as a result of a Category 2 hurricane making landfall just to the south of Cocoa Beach, Florida. Several other ships are washed ashore from Jupiter Inlet to the mouth of the St. Johns River, and another is damaged in the Gulf of Mexico after the hurricane crosses the state. In Cedar Key it is considered one of the worst hurricanes on record, with several buildings destroyed.
September 8, 1880 – A tropical storm hits near Yankeetown, producing light amounts of rain and wind across the northern portion of the state.
October 8, 1880 – The ninth storm and eighth hurricane of the season moves ashore just south of Yankeetown, though its impact, if any, is unknown.
August 1, 1881 – Pensacola reports 15.95 inches (405 mm) of rainfall in association with a tropical storm that hits near the Alabama/Mississippi border.
August 28, 1881 – Jacksonville experiences light winds from a hurricane that strikes Savannah, Georgia.
September 10, 1882 – The second hurricane of the season makes landfall as a major hurricane at Pensacola, where it was considered to be among the most severe on record. Several boats are washed ashore along the Gulf of Mexico coastline. In and around Jacksonville, the strong winds greatly damage the cotton crop and destroy several buildings, killing five people.
October 11, 1882 – A minimal hurricane hits near Yankeetown, causing moderate coastal flooding and heavy rainfall.
September 10, 1883 – Jacksonville reports heavy rainfall in intervals and moderate winds from a hurricane paralleling the eastern coastline.
September 10, 1884 – An offshore tropical storm which later becomes a hurricane produces higher than normal tides in northeastern Florida.
August 24, 1885 – Light rainfall and gale-force winds is reported in Jacksonville in association with a hurricane paralleling the eastern coastline.
August 30, September 21, and September 30, 1885 – Three tropical storms affect western Florida. Winds were not exceptionally strong, though the passage of the three storms contribute to a wet month in some portions of northern Florida, with precipitation accumulating to around 20 inches (500 mm) of rain.
October 11, 1885 – The eighth storm of the season hits near the mouth of the Steinhatchee River, producing localized street flooding and moderate winds.
June 21, 1886 – An unusual Category 2 hurricane in the month of June strikes near St. Marks, producing strong winds gusts but little damage.
June 30, 1886 – A week after the previous storm, another Category 2 hurricane hits the central Florida Panhandle, causing damage to numerous ships and capsizing several others. The winds of the hurricane destroy dozens of houses and buildings, killing several people.
July 19, 1886 – The fourth storm of the season makes landfall near Yankeetown and produces gusty winds yet little damage.
July 27, 1887 – A hurricane hits near Pensacola and produces heavy rainfall peaking at 8 inches (203 mm) in Cedar Key. The rainfall, in combination with strong winds and rough seas, cause heavy damage to crops and roads.
August 22, 1887 – A major hurricane paralleling the eastern coastline produces strong winds near the coast.
October 20, 1887 – Heavy rainfall is reported in association with a hurricane crossing the northwestern Florida Panhandle.
October 30, 1887 – The sixteenth storm of the season hits near Tampa, though its effects, if any, are unknown.
August 16, 1888 – A major hurricane moves ashore on southeastern Florida, producing 2.02 inches (51 mm) of precipitation at Jupiter and a storm tide of 14 feet (4.3 m) at Miami. Damage is unknown.
September 7, 1888 – 2.48 inches (63 mm) of rain is recorded in Fort Meade in association with a tropical storm striking near Palm Beach.
September 23, 1888 – The sixth storm of the season formed just south of the Florida Keys before briefly moving onshore in the extreme southeastern portion of the state. Effects, if any, are unknown.
October 11, 1888 – A Category 2 hurricane hits near Yankeetown. It produces high tides and moderate winds, and destroys a hotel on Fort George Island.
June 17, 1889 – The second storm of the season moves ashore near Yankeetown. Impact, if any, is unknown.
September 23, 1889 – After weakening from hurricane status, a tropical storm makes landfall on Pensacola, though its effects, if any, are unknown.
October 6, 1889 – The final storm of the season strikes extreme southern Florida after passing through the Florida Keys, causing no known effects.

1890–1899
August 24, 1891 – A minimal hurricane hits near Homestead, though due to lack of observations near the landfall location its impact in the state is unknown.
October 7, 1891 – The seventh storm of the season strikes Cape Sable and causes no known impact.
October 9, 1891 – Shortly after becoming an extratropical cyclone, a storm crosses the state from Fort Myers to Cape Canaveral, producing light winds across the state.
June 10, 1892 – A tropical storm which makes landfall near Cape Sable drops large amounts of precipitation across the southern Florida.
September 12, 1892 – Southeastern Louisiana is hit by a tropical storm, with winds in Pensacola reaching .
October 24, 1892 – Heavy rainfall is reported in southern Florida as a result of a tropical storm hitting Tampa Bay.
June 16, 1893 – Saint Marks is struck by a tropical storm. Moderate winds and rainfall occurs throughout the northeastern portion of the state, including a total of 1.51 inches in Jacksonville.
August 27, 1893 – The Sea Islands Hurricane parallels the eastern coastline as a major hurricane, producing winds in excess of  near the coast. The winds destroy nine cottages in Mayport.
October 2, 1893 – The Cheniere Caminada Hurricane makes landfall on southeastern Louisiana, though its large and powerful circulation damages Pensacola with high tides and winds.
October 12, 1893 – A major hurricane parallels the coastline about 60 miles (95 km) offshore. The storm tide was high enough that at low tide, it was at the position of the normal high tide mark. The tide caused street flooding in Saint Augustine, with heavy damage reported in Mayport.
August 7, 1894 – The second storm of the season hits just west of the Florida/Alabama border. Pensacola reports  winds in association with the storm, though damage, if any, is unknown.
September 25, 1894 – A hurricane makes landfall near Fort Myers. In Tampa, rainfall reached 13.78 inches (350 mm), causing coastal flooding in areas.  Heavy damage was reported in several cities in northeastern Florida.
October 9, 1894 – A major hurricane hits moves ashore near Pensacola, producing high tides and heavy rainfall.
October 2, 1895 – Heavy rainfall occurs in southern Florida as a result of a tropical storm passing a short distance to the south of the state.
October 16, 1895 – Naples is struck by a tropical storm whose impact is unknown.
October 22, 1895 – An offshore hurricane causes high tides and strong winds in southeastern Florida.
July 7, 1896 – A Category 2 hurricane hits near Pensacola. There, strong winds destroy the roofs of about 35 houses and wreck 9 boats. Damage in the city is estimated at over $100,000 (1896 USD, $2.6 million 2008 USD).
September 29, 1896 – The fourth storm makes landfall as a major hurricane on Yankeetown with a pressure of 960 mbar. Strong winds downed hundreds of trees and caused severe damage amounting to $1.5 million (1896 USD, $36 million 2006 USD). Multiple deaths were reported in the state.
October 9, 1896 – A tropical storm hits near Fort Myers, though its impact is unknown.
It is unknown if the hurricane causes damage in the state.
September 21, 1897 – The third storm of the season moves ashore just north of Fort Myers and produces heavy rainfall, including a 24‑hour total of 6.56 inches (166 mm) in Tampa.

August 2, 1898 – A tropical storm makes landfall near Palm Beach, crosses the state, and intensifies in the Gulf of Mexico before hitting Apalachicola as a hurricane. Three barges, four tug boats, and several boats are destroyed, and numerous wharves and dwellings are damaged as a result of the storm. Four people die from the shipwrecks.
October 2, 1898 – A Category 4 hurricane hits southern Georgia, causing severe damage in the extreme northeastern portion of the state. A storm surge of 12 feet floods and damages several buildings along the Fernandina waterfront. A conservative estimate for total damage in the state is $500,000 (1898 USD, $13 million 2008 USD).
August 1, 1899 – After previously moving across southwestern Florida, a Category 2 hurricane strikes Apalachicola. The storm causes $575,000 in boat, crop, and property damage (1899 USD, $14.8 million 2008 USD), and also results in six fatalities.
August 13, 1899 – The San Ciriaco Hurricane parallels the eastern coastline, producing moderate winds and light damage.
October 5, 1899 – A tropical storm hits near Tampa and sinks a schooner off Fernandina Beach.
October 30, 1899 – A hurricane parallels the eastern Florida coastline, with several locations near the coast recording strong winds in association with the storm. No cases of serious damage are reported.

Monthly statistics

Deadly storms
The following is a list of hurricanes with known deaths in the state. Several other hurricanes killed an unknown number of people in Florida, and multiple others left several missing.

See also

 List of Atlantic hurricanes

References

 1899
19th century in Florida
Florida 1899
Florida 1899
Hurricanes